The Chief of the General Staff, also known as the Commander-in-Chief of the Israel Defense Forces (abbreviated Ramatkal—), is the supreme commander and head of the Israel Defense Forces. The current Chief of the General Staff is Herzi Halevi.

At any given time, the Chief of the General Staff is the only active officer holding the IDF's highest rank, rav aluf, which is usually translated into English as lieutenant general, a three-star rank. The only exception to this rule occurred during the Yom Kippur War, when former Chief of the General Staff Haim Bar-Lev, who was a cabinet member at the outbreak of and during the war, was brought out of retirement and installed as chief of Southern Command. For a brief period, he and Chief of the General Staff David Elazar were both in active service with the rank of rav aluf.

History 
The role of the Chief of the General Staff began with the Haganah organization, where it was named after the head of the general staff of the Haganah. With the establishment of the IDF, the Chief of Defense and the Chief of Staff, headed by Yaakov Dori, were converted to head the IDF.

The chief of the general staff is officially appointed for a three-year term, which can be extended for another year. An exception was Rafael Eitan, whose term was extended twice, and he served a total of five years. On the other hand, there were several chiefs of staff who did not complete their full term: Yigal Yadin resigned amid disagreements over the IDF budget, Mordechai Maklef served for only one year at his request, David Elazar was forced to resign following the recommendations of the Agranat Commission investigating the Yom Kippur War, and Dan Halutz resigned due to criticism of the Second Lebanon War. Also, two chiefs of staff have given up part of their tenure extension: Amnon Lipkin-Shahak wanted to end his term in the middle of the fourth year, due to his desire to move into politics and run for prime minister. Haim Laskov asked not to serve a fourth year due to his disagreements with Shimon Peres.

In 2005, Ariel Sharon and Shaul Mofaz did not extend Moshe Ya'alon's term to a fourth year, during which he was interpreted as a dismissal in light of Ya'alon's opposition to the disengagement plan. In order to prevent such problems in the future, and as was done for other positions such as that of the President of the State, Defense Minister Amir Peretz appointed Major General Gabi Ashkenazi in 2007 for a period of four years, thus removing the uncertainty regarding the addition of the fourth year. Ashkenazi raised the issue of extending his term to a fifth year.

At the end of his term, the Chief of the General Staff (like other senior members of the Israeli defense establishment) has a cooling-off period of three years before he can be elected a Member of the Knesset, be appointed a Minister in the Government or be elected Prime Minister.

Legal position
The position of ramatkal is defined in the Basic Law: The Military (1976), clause three:

The supreme command rank in the military is that of the Chief of the General Staff
The Chief of the General Staff is to be placed under the authority of the government and subordinate to the Defense Minister
The Chief of the General Staff is to be appointed by the government, according to the recommendation of the Defense Minister

The Chief of the General Staff is formally appointed once every three years, with the government often extending the term to four years, and in one occasion, even five.

Significance
Given the importance of the IDF in Israeli society, the Chief of the General Staff is an important public figure in Israel. On appointment of a new Chief of the General Staff, mass-circulation papers such as Yediot Aharonot and Israel Hayom customarily provide their readers with large-scale portrait photos of the new Chief. Former Chiefs of the General Staff often parlay the prominence of their position into political life, and sometimes the business world. Two Chiefs of the General Staff (Yitzhak Rabin and Ehud Barak) have become Prime Minister of Israel and eleven others (Yigael Yadin, Moshe Dayan, Tzvi Tzur, Haim Bar-Lev, Mordechai Gur, Rafael Eitan, Amnon Lipkin-Shahak, Shaul Mofaz, Moshe Ya'alon, Gabi Ashkenazi, and Benny Gantz) have served in the Knesset. Of these, only Tzur did not get appointed to the Cabinet.

Six former Chiefs of the General Staff (Dayan, Rabin, Barak, Mofaz, Ya'alon, and Gantz) held the position of Defense Minister, widely considered to be one of the most powerful ministerial posts in the country and the immediate civilian superior of the Chief of the General Staff. The current holder of the post (as of March 2021) is former Chief of the General Staff Benny Gantz. Moshe Dayan served also as Foreign Minister. Soon after his discharge, Dan Halutz became the CEO of a prestigious car importer. Ehud Barak took a hiatus from politics twice after defeats for re-election and pursued international business ventures.

List of Chiefs of the General Staff
The Chiefs of the General Staff have been:

Timeline

References

Military ranks of Israel

Israeli generals
Israel
Commanders in chief